Oberperfuss is a municipality in the district of Innsbruck-Land in the Austrian state of Tyrol located about  west of Innsbruck at the entrance of the Sellrain Valley. It was mentioned in documents around 1083 for the first time.

Population

Geography 
Oberperfuss is located in the Inn Valley about 15 km west of Innsbruck, on a low mountain terrace opposite Grinzens, at the entrance to the Sellrain Valley.

History 
According to the Inn valley tax book of 1312, about 300 inhabitants from the farming class lived in Oberperfuss at that time, plus craftsmen and wage laborers. Around the year 1600 there were probably already about 800 inhabitants. According to the last census in 2001, 2712 people lived in the community. The majority of the inhabitants commute, especially to the provincial capital Innsbruck.

References

External links

Cities and towns in Innsbruck-Land District